Savage Islands Nature Reserve is a Portuguese nature reserve located in the Savage Islands, a small archipelago in the Northeast Atlantic Ocean. Created in 1971, it is one of the oldest protected areas in the country. The strict nature reserve occupies an area of  after its expansion in 2021, and over 99% of the total area is maritime. 

In May 2016, a National Geographic Society scientific expedition prompted the extension of the marine reserve.

References

Nature reserves in Portugal
Madeira